Metarbela shimonii is a moth in the family Cossidae. It is found in Kenya, where it has been recorded from Gogoni Forest and Kaya Muhaka. The habitat consists of legume-dominated lowland coastal forests.

The length of the forewings is about 9 mm. The forewings are greyish-olive with a tawny olive streak, edged black with minute white spots. The hindwings are fuscous.

Etymology
The species is named for Shimoni Lehmann, the son of the author.

References

Natural History Museum Lepidoptera generic names catalog

Endemic moths of Kenya
Metarbelinae
Moths described in 2008